Almajeq (also Romanized as Ālmājeq, Ālmajeq, and Ālmajoq) is a village in Dughayi Rural District, in the Central District of Quchan County, Razavi Khorasan Province, Iran. At the 2006 census, its population was 1,291, in 312 families.

See also 

 List of cities, towns and villages in Razavi Khorasan Province

References 

Populated places in Quchan County